Sir 	Thomas Montague Morrison Wilde, 3rd Baron Truro (11 March 1856 – 8 March 1899) was an English first-class cricketer and barrister.

The son of Thomas Montague Carrington Wilde, he was born at Manchester in March 1856. He was educated at Harrow School, before going up to Trinity College, Cambridge. A student of the Inner Temple, he graduated from Cambridge with a Bachelor of Laws in 1878 and was called to the bar to practice as a barrister in July of the same year. He played first-class cricket for the Marylebone Cricket Club from 1881–83, making four appearances. Wilde scored 117 runs in his four matches, with a high score of 37.

He succeeded his uncle, Sir Charles Wilde, as the 3rd Baron Truro upon his death in March 1891. The barony became extinct upon Wilde's death at Menton in France in March 1899.

References

External links

1856 births
1899 deaths
Lawyers from Manchester
People educated at Harrow School
Alumni of Trinity College, Cambridge
Members of the Inner Temple
English cricketers
Marylebone Cricket Club cricketers
Barons in the Peerage of the United Kingdom
19th-century English lawyers